Agassiz's perchlet (Ambassis agassizii), also known as Agassiz's glass fish and the olive perchlet, is a species of ray-finned fish in the family Ambassidae. It is semi-transparent with dark scale edges forming a pattern over most of the body. It grows to a maximum of 7.5 cm. It is a macrophyte spawner with adhesive eggs. It is endemic to Australia. It was named for the zoologist Louis Agassiz.

Description
Agassiz's perchlet has a laterally compressed, oval shaped body with a moderately large, oblique mouth, very large eyes and a forked tail. They are normally semi-transparent but may be olive in colour have dark-edges to their scales which creat a distinct, network pattern with a thin black line along the middle of the flanks which becomes more obvious towards the tail.. The fins are mostly translucent but there is frequently a wide, dusky band along the margins of the pelvic and anal fins. They can grow to about  but  is a more common length. The teeth are conical and are found on the jaws, the vomer and palatines while the head has some small spines. It has a lateral line which is incomplete and often divided into two sections. The dorsal fin is deeply notched and has its origin in front of the pelvic fins. The first spine of the dorsal spine is small and projects forwards.

Distribution
Agassiz's perchlet is endemic to Australia where it is now only found in Queensland, New South Wales and Victoria. It occurs in coastal streams in New South Wales and Queensland and it previously occurred in South Australia but is now thought to have been extirpated from that state. They were once widespread in the Murray-Darling basin in South Australia, Victoria, western New South Wales and southern Queensland, but the population has declined and the range has contracted. It is now known to occur at a limited number of sites in the Darling River drainage and an isolated population in the central Lachlan catchment. In 2008 a large population was found in a tributary of the Lachlan River near the Brewster Weir in New South Wales. In 2022 the species was rediscovered in Victoria after not being recorded in the state for 93 years, in Mullaroo Creek within Murray-Sunset National Park.

Habitat and biology
Agassiz's perchlet occurs rivers, creeks, ponds and swamps with a preference for slow flowing or still waters where they normally inhabit more sheltered areas where there is overhanging vegetation, beds of aquatic macrophytes, logs, dead branches and boulders where they can hide during the day. They are nocturnal and they leave their hiding places to feed at night, although they often feed during the day. They attain sexual maturity after a year and their lifespan is 2–4 years. The larvae hatch from the eggs after 5–7 days  and are 3mm in total length, they start to swim and feed 4–5 days, sometimes up to 9 days, after hatching. The larvae school close to the top of the water column for approximately one month. Little is known about this species migratory patterns but in coastal streams they have been recorded moving through fish passes in tidal barrages.

Conservation
Agassiz's perchlet is threatened by predation by non native fish species which have been introduced into its range such as Gambusia holbrooki and the European perch (Perca fluviatilis). There has been degradation of its habitat by the removal of vegetation, logs and snags, rapid fluctuations in water levels caused by river regulation have negatively affected their breeding. An example of this is the failure of the fish to spawn caused by cold water releases from dams. The vegetation they shelter in has been lost due to water regulation and through grazing by the introduced common carp (Cyprinus carpio). They are present in the aquarium trade.

Etymology
The specific name was not explained by Steindachner when he described this species but it almost certainly honours the Swiss-American biologist and geologist Louis Agassiz (1807-1873).

References

 Pusey, B. Kennard, M Arthington, A (2004) Freshwater Fishes of North-eastern Australia, CSIRO Publishing. (Available from CSIRO Publishing)

External links

Agassiz's perchlet
Murray-Darling basin
Freshwater fish of Australia
Agassiz's perchlet
Taxa named by Franz Steindachner
Taxonomy articles created by Polbot